The Girl Guides Association of Jamaica (GGAJ) is the Guiding organisation of Jamaica. It served 5,903 members (as of 2006). Founded in 1915, the girls-only organisation became an associate member of the World Association of Girl Guides and Girl Scouts in 1963 and a full member in 1966.

History

Girl Guiding was introduced to Jamaica by Miss Clare Messias in 1915. After Jamaica's independence in 1962, the Jamaican Girl Guides remained a branch of the United Kingdom's Guide Association until July 17, 1967, when the Girl Guides Association of Jamaica was incorporated.

A scission of the association led to the formation of the Girl Scouts of Jamaica in 2008.

Program
The association works in three age-groups:
 Brownies - ages 7 to 11
 Guides - ages 10 to 16
 Senior section - ages 14 to 20

One focus of the program is the prevention of AIDS.

Ideals
 Guide promise
I promise that I will do my best
To do my duty to God
To serve the Queen and my country and help other people
And to keep the Guide Law.

 Guide Law
 A Guide is loyal and can be trusted.
 A Guide is helpful.
 A Guide is polite and considerate.
 A Guide is friendly and a sister to all Guides.
 A Guide is kind to animals and respects all living things.
 A Guide is obedient.
 A Guide has courage and is cheerful in all difficulties.
 A Guide makes good use of her time.
 A Guide takes care of her possessions and those of other people.
 A Guide is self-controlled in all she thinks, says and does.

 Guide Motto
Be Prepared

See also
 Scouting in Jamaica
 Girl Scouts of Jamaica

References

World Association of Girl Guides and Girl Scouts member organizations
Scouting and Guiding in Jamaica
1915 establishments in the British Empire
Youth organizations established in 1915